Mowlik is a surname. Notable people with the surname include:

 Mariusz Mowlik (born 1981), Polish footballer and sporting director
 Piotr Mowlik (born 1951), Polish footballer

See also
 

Polish-language surnames